Blue Ball is an unincorporated community and census-designated place (CDP) in East Earl Township, Lancaster County, Pennsylvania, United States. As of the 2010 census the population was 1,031.

Name and origin
The name originates from the Blue Ball Hotel, built more than two hundred years ago, which stood on the southeast corner of the PA 23-US 322 crossroads. The inn was torn down in 1997. In the early 18th century, John Wallace built a small building in Earl Town at the intersection of two Indian trails, French Creek Path (Route 23) and Paxtang (Route 322). He hung a blue ball out front from a post and called it "The Sign of the Blue Ball". Locals soon began calling the town "Blue Ball" after the inn. In 1833, Earl Town officially changed its name to Blue Ball. During Prohibition, the inn changed its name to Blue Ball Hotel.

Trivia
The town's name has a suggestive second meaning, evoking the slang term "blue balls" (1916), also known as "hot nuts," which refers to the sexual condition of temporary testicular and prostate fluid congestion due to prolonged and unsatisfied sexual excitement. Blue Ball is often listed among the "delightfully-named towns" in  Pennsylvania Dutch Country, alongside Pleasureville, Intercourse, Mount Joy, Lititz, Bareville, Bird-in-Hand, Fertility and Paradise.

Geography
Blue Ball is in eastern Lancaster County, in the western part of East Earl Township. Pennsylvania Route 23 (Main Street) leads northeast  to the Pennsylvania Turnpike at Morgantown and southwest through New Holland  to Lancaster, the county seat. U.S. Route 322 (Division Highway) crosses PA 23 in the center of Blue Ball; it leads northwest  to Ephrata and southeast  to Downingtown.

Shirks Run which flows through Blue Ball, leading northwest to the Conestoga River. It has a hot-summer humid continental climate (Dfa) like the remainder of Lancaster County. Average monthly temperatures range from 30.0° F in January to 74.6° F in July.  The hardiness zone is 6b.

Demographics

Notes

References 
Anderson, William Charles (1979) Home sweet home has wheels: or, Please don't tailgate the real estate
Henry Louis Mencken, Raven Ioor McDavid (1963) The American language: an inquiry into the development of English in the United States, Volume 1
Museums Association (2006) The Museums journal, Volume 106, Issues 1-6, Indexes to papers read before the Museums Association, 1890–1909. Compiled by Charles Madeley.
Paul Krassner (1963) The Trial of Eros Magazine in The Realist No.44, pp. 1, 11-23
Rand McNally and Company (1978) Vacation & travel guide
Ward's quarterly, Volume 1, 1965

Unincorporated communities in Lancaster County, Pennsylvania
Unincorporated communities in Pennsylvania
Census-designated places in Lancaster County, Pennsylvania
Census-designated places in Pennsylvania